Aviation Island may refer to:
 Aviation Islands in Antarctica
 An islet in Palmyra Atoll, US Minor Outlying Islands